The 2013 FIBA 3x3 World Tour was an international 3x3 basketball between 3x3 basketball teams. The tournament is organized by FIBA.

Finals Qualification
Five Masters Tournaments were held in five cities in five countries. 12 teams participated in the finals which was held in Istanbul, Turkey on October 4–5. Two best teams from each masters tournament qualified for the finals.

Final standing

References

FIBA 3x3 World Tour seasons
World Tour